Ursula Pankraths is a retired East German rower who won six medals at European championships between 1961 and 1969, including three gold medals.

References 

Living people
East German female rowers
Year of birth missing (living people)